Getting Even (1971) is Woody Allen's first collection of humorous stories, essays, and one short play. Most pieces were first published in The New Yorker between 1966 and 1971.

Contents
 The Metterling Lists
 A Look at Organized Crime
 The Schmeed Memoirs
 My Philosophy
 Yes, But Can the Steam Engine Do This?
 Death Knocks
 Spring Bulletin
 Hassidic Tales
 The Gossage-Vardebedian Papers
 Notes from the Overfed
 A Twenties Memory
 Count Dracula
 A Little Louder, Please
 Conversations with Helmholtz
 Viva Vargas!
 The Discovery and Use of the Fake Ink Blot
 Mr. Big

Some of the tales in detail
"Mr. Big" is a parody of the style and structure of hardboiled detective stories. The protagonist, Kaiser Lupowitz, is a parody of the characters which were typically played by Humphrey Bogart on film: Dashiell Hammett's Sam Spade in The Maltese Falcon, Mickey Spillane's Mike Hammer and Raymond Chandler's Philip Marlowe. Kaiser smokes Lucky Strike like Sam Spade, and is also used by Allen in another hard boiled parody, The Whore of Mensa (1974), collected in Without Feathers (1975).
The philosophical arguments of "My Philosophy" will be later used in the films Bananas and Love and Death.
The play "Death Knocks" is a direct parody of Ingmar Bergman's 1957 The Seventh Seal.
"The Schmeed Memoirs" heavily parodies Felix Kersten.

Notes and references

External links
 Woody Allen's bibliography

1971 books
Comedy books
Random House books
Short story collections by Woody Allen